Garibald II (585–625) was Duke of Bavaria from 610 until his death. He was the son of Tassilo I.

He married Geila, daughter of Gisulf II of Friuli and Romilda.

The successors of Garibald II are not completely known. Bavarian tradition places Theodo I, Theodo II, and Theodo III in the realm of legend, as mythical Agilofing ancestors. The next well-documented Agilofing duke is Theodo. This, however, leaves a half-century gap between Garibald and his next known successor.

References
 Wilhelm Störmer, Die Baiuwaren. Von der Völkerwanderung bis Tassilo III. 2nd ed. Beck, 2007.

585 births
625 deaths
7th-century dukes of Bavaria
Agilolfings